Leisure Bay is a small seaside resort village located on the Lower South Coast of KwaZulu-Natal in South Africa.

Geography 
Leisure Bay is situated between Port Edward and Glenmore and 26 km south-west of Port Shepstone and 98 km south-west of Durban.

Leisure Bay is regarded as one of the many extensions of Port Edward including Glenmore, Munster and Palm Beach. The village can also been seen as a collective with the villages of Leisure Crest to the north and Ivy Beach to the south.

Lifestyle 
The village is a quiet one and remains unspoilt with most of it covered in subtropical vegetation due to the little development occurring in these villages between Port Edward and Margate. It is also popular with artists, and many of them live and work in the area due to the tranquil lifestyle of the village.

Tourism 
As the name implies, Leisure Bay acts very much as a holiday destination or a relaxation escape for tourists.

Leisure Bay has access to three shark-protected beaches Kidds Beach (not to be confused with Kidd's Beach in the Eastern Cape), T.O Beach and Ivy Beach which are patrolled by lifeguards during school holiday periods.

Transport 
Leisure Bay has no access to public transport and is therefore dependent on private transportation. It is accessed by the R61 which connects to Port Edward, Mbizana and Mthatha to the south and Port Shepstone, Margate and Durban (via the N2) to the north.

Leisure Bay Conservancy 
The Leisure Bay Conservancy includes the area from the Boboyi River in the south, the Thongazi River in the north, the Indian Ocean in the east and the R61 in the west and is registered with Ezemvelo KZN Wildlife and Conservation KZN since January 2012. The conservancy was formed to preserve the biodiversity in the natural environment of coastal and riverine forest, coastal bush, grasslands, help control the invasion of alien species, and promote the planting of indigenous vegetation in Leisure Bay. This successively assists in preserving wildlife in the area, including caracal, water mongoose, bushbuck, duiker, leopard and a wide range of bird and insect life.

This is one of 6 conservancies in the Port Edward/Southbroom area including part of a broader green belt that includes the Munster, Trafalgar, Mpenjati, Marina Beach and Umtamvuna conservancies.

References 

Populated places in the Ray Nkonyeni Local Municipality